The Muppets Celebrate Jim Henson is a one-hour special that aired on CBS on November 21, 1990. The program was a tribute to Muppet creator Jim Henson, who had died earlier in 1990 due to toxic shock syndrome caused by a streptococcus infection, and featured characters from The Muppet Show, Fraggle Rock, and Sesame Street.

It marked Steve Whitmire's first onscreen performance as Kermit the Frog.

Plot
Kermit the Frog is away traveling, leaving Fozzie Bear and the other Muppets in charge of the week's production number. On the day of the show, the Muppets receive a letter from Kermit informing them the production number is meant to pay tribute to Jim Henson. However, the group is unfamiliar with who Henson is. The rest of the special depicts the Muppets figuring out Jim Henson's relation to them, while simultaneously creating the production number.

Through the course of the special, interviews of several special guests are shown (including Carol Burnett, Ray Charles, John Denver, Steven Spielberg, Harry Belafonte and Frank Oz), where each guest recounts their personal experiences with Henson and his contributions to film, television, puppetry and philanthropy.

As the Muppets are nearing the presentation of their Jim Henson tribute number, Fozzie discovers some of Jim Henson's fan mail. One of the letters, which is addressed to Kermit, initially starts out cheerfully, but then reveals that Henson has died, much to the Muppets' shock. They take turns reading different letters from fans. Finally, Fozzie cancels the production number, deeming it improper for the occasion. Kermit's nephew Robin tries to convince Fozzie otherwise by breaking into "Just One Person" (a song which was featured in the 1977 Bernadette Peters episode of The Muppet Show). Eventually, the song becomes a large musical number with characters from Sesame Street and Fraggle Rock joining in. As the Muppets finish singing, Kermit arrives and congratulates the group on finding the proper way of honoring Henson. He then decides to enact Fozzie's original number (by saying they should do something silly to end it) and addresses the audience, thanking them and promising "more Muppet stuff because that's the way the boss would want it."

Cast
 Harry Belafonte - himself
 Carol Burnett - herself
 Ray Charles - himself
 John Denver - himself
 Jim Henson - himself (archive footage)
 Frank Oz - himself
 Steven Spielberg - himself

Muppet performers
 Frank Oz - Fozzie Bear, Miss Piggy, Bert, and Animal
 Jerry Nelson - Robin the Frog, Lew Zealand, Announcer, and Floyd Pepper
 Richard Hunt - Scooter and Janice
 Dave Goelz - Gonzo the Great, Beauregard and Zoot
 Steve Whitmire - Rizzo the Rat, Bean Bunny, Kermit the Frog, and Whoopie Cushion
 Kevin Clash - Clifford and Elmo
 Kathryn Mullen - Joy Buzzer and Mokey Fraggle
 Caroll Spinney - Big Bird
 Pam Arciero - Grundgetta

Additional Muppets performed by Camille Bonora, Fran Brill, Jim Martin, Joey Mazzarino, Peter MacKennan, Carmen Osbahr, Martin P. Robinson, David Rudman, Cheryl Henson, and Bill Prady

Production notes
The set used for this special intentionally combines elements from the backstage set used in The Muppet Show and the control room set used in The Jim Henson Hour. The special was later syndicated alongside The Muppet Show.

This would be one of the last productions Richard Hunt performed Scooter and Janice before his death in 1992.

The logo for the special incorporated characters from all three of Henson's most widely known productions, with Kermit, Miss Piggy, and Fozzie joined by Gobo Fraggle and a Doozer from Fraggle Rock, and Cookie Monster from Sesame Street.

References

External links
 

The Muppets television specials
Disney television specials
1990 television specials
CBS television specials
1990s American television specials
Television shows written by Jerry Juhl